The Stolen Jewels can refer to:

 The Stolen Jewels (1908 film), a 1908 film directed by D. W. Griffith
 The Stolen Jewels (1915 film), a 1915 film directed by Jack Harvey
 The Stolen Jools, a 1931 Laurel & Hardy film